Buck Island National Wildlife Refuge is located about 2 miles (4 km) south of the island of St. Thomas in the Virgin Islands of the United States.  Adjacent to the refuge is Capella Island, about half the size of Buck, owned by the territorial government. There is a second Buck Island just north of St. Croix that is the centerpiece of Buck Island Reef National Monument.

The refuge is characterized by a thorn scrub habitat with rocky coastline surrounded by spectacular reefs. The island was transferred to the United States Fish and Wildlife Service due to "its value for migratory birds." The U.S. Navy transferred some lands in 1969 and the remainder was received from the Coast Guard in 1981. The surrounding waters contain reefs and a shipwreck that attract large numbers of snorkelers, divers, and boaters.

The islands are surrounded by beautiful coral reef habitats and an artificial reef – a shipwreck. The marine area is home to a variety of fish and animals, in particular endangered sea turtles.

Turtle Cove, on the northwest side, is densely populated with sea turtles. Tours of Turtle Cove are available from St. John and St. Thomas.

Buck Island NWR is administered as part of the Caribbean Islands National Wildlife complex.

See also

 List of lighthouses in the United States Virgin Islands
 List of National Wildlife Refuges

References

External links
Buck Island National Wildlife Refuge homepage

National Wildlife Refuges of the United States in the Caribbean
Protected areas of the United States Virgin Islands
Uninhabited islands of the United States Virgin Islands
National Register of Historic Places in the United States Virgin Islands
Protected areas established in 1969
1969 establishments in the United States Virgin Islands
Southside, Saint Thomas, U.S. Virgin Islands
Lighthouses in insular areas of the United States